Colforsin daropate is a carboxylic ester derived from the condensation of forskolin (colforsin) with N,N-dimethyl-β-alanine.

Its water-soluble hydrochloride salt (NKH 477) is an adenylyl cyclase activator which has been studied for its cardiac selectivity. 

Its parent compound forskolin (colforsin) is also used to raise levels of cAMP in the study of cell physiology.

References

Acetate esters
Vinyl compounds